Pomezí nad Ohří is a municipality and village in Cheb District in the Karlovy Vary Region of the Czech Republic. It has about 300 inhabitants.

Administrative parts
The village of Hraničná is an administrative part of Pomezí nad Ohří.

References

Villages in Cheb District